Rafal is a municipality in the Valencian Community (Spain) situated in the south of the province of Alicante, in the comarca of Vega Baja del Segura.

References

Populated places in the Province of Alicante